It's the Thought... is the seventh studio and Christmas album by Christian singer-songwriter Twila Paris, released in 1989 by Star Song Records. It was the last album that Paris collaborated with producer Jonathan David Brown. The album is not your typical Christmas record, aside from "White Christmas" used in medley form with "Whiter Than Snow". Paris wrote four original songs and her father Oren Paris II wrote "This World", about the change that the first Christmas had on the entire world. The album debuted and peaked at number 15 on the Billboard Top Inspirational Albums chart.

Track listing

Personnel 
 Twila Paris – lead vocals, backing vocals (3)
 Carl Marsh – keyboards, Fairlight III programming, arrangements 
 Hal Brown – additional acoustic piano (5)
 Tom Hemby – acoustic guitars, mandolin
 Jerry McPherson – electric guitars
 Gary Lunn – bass 
 Mark Hammond – drums 
 Eric Darken – percussion
 Lisa Glasgow – backing vocals (1, 2, 3, 5, 7, 8)
 Tammy Jensen – backing vocals (1, 2, 3, 5, 7, 8)
 Marabeth Jordan – backing vocals (1)
 Tim Marshall – backing vocals (1)
 Leah Taylor – backing vocals (1, 2, 3, 5, 7, 8)
 Steven V. Taylor – backing vocals (1, 2, 3, 5, 7, 8), BGV arrangements (1, 2, 3, 5, 7, 8)
 Raymond Weaver – backing vocals (1, 2, 3, 5, 7, 8)
 Greg X. Volz – backing vocals (3)
 Jonathan David Brown – producer, recording, mixing 
 Ken Love – mastering at MasterMix (Nashville, Tennessee)
 Karen Horner – art direction, design 
 Toni Thigpen – art direction 
 Jackson Design – design 
 Paul Micich – illustration

Critical reception 
Dacia A. Blodgett-Williams of AllMusic wrote "The ever popular Christian crooner Twila Paris shows the reason for her longevity with this holiday release. Strong vocals and stress-relieving accompaniment are trademarks of the album, and it includes a good mix of contemporary and traditional carols."

Charts

Radio singles

References 

1989 Christmas albums
Twila Paris albums